Isotuberculosinol synthase (Rv3378c) is an enzyme with systematic name tuberculosinyl diphosphate diphosphohydrolase (isotuberculosinol forming). This enzyme catalyses the following chemical reaction

 tuberculosinyl diphosphate + H2O  (13S)-isotuberculosinol + diphosphate

This enzyme is present in species of Mycobacterium that cause tuberculosis.

References

External links 
 

EC 3.1.7